Ceren Kapucu (née Kestirengöz, born 19 July 1993 in Istanbul) is a Turkish volleyball player. She is 194 cm and plays as hitter. She is part of the Turkey women's national volleyball team.

She was born on 19 July 1993 in Istanbul to former volleyball player parents. She has a brother. Kestirengöz began with volleyball at the age of eleven and entered Vakıfbank Güneş Sigorta's farm team.  She graduated from St. Joseph High School in Istanbul. In the 2013-14 term, she begins to study Business Administration at Bahçeşehir University.

Ceren Kestirengöz played one season in the A-team of Vakıfbank and then was sent to Sarıyer Belediyesi on loan in the 2012-13 season. For the 2013-14 season, she was transferred by the Yeşilyurtspor.

Kestirengöz debuted in the youth national team in 2008, which won the gold medal at the Girls' Youth Balkan Volleyball Championship held in Portaria, Greece. The next year, she was again part of the youth national team, which became runner-up at the Balkan Championship in Sarajevo, Bosnia and Herzegovina.

In 2011, she won the bronze medal with the national team at the Women's European Volleyball Championship held in Belgrade, Serbia. Kapucu played for the national team at the 2012 Women's European Volleyball League, which placed 8th.

Awards
National team
2008 Girls' Youth Balkan Volleyball Championship - 
2009 Girls' Youth Balkan Volleyball Championship - 
2011 Women's European Volleyball Championship - 
 2015 Women's European Volleyball League –

See also
 Turkish women in sports

References

External links
 

1993 births
Living people
Volleyball players from Istanbul
Turkish women's volleyball players
VakıfBank S.K. volleyballers
Yeşilyurt volleyballers
Bahçeşehir University alumni
St. Joseph High School Istanbul alumni
Competitors at the 2018 Mediterranean Games
Mediterranean Games bronze medalists for Turkey
Mediterranean Games medalists in volleyball